Marcus Atilius Regulus was a Roman consul in 294 BC. During his year, according to Livy's main source, he served against the Samnites and Apulians without great success until he vowed a temple to Jupiter Stator. After a victory at Interamna, Livy reports that a triumph was refused; the Acta Triumphorum however report that Regulus triumphed over the Volsones and the Samnites.

This Regulus is possibly related to the later homonymous consul of 267 BC. He was probably the son of the consul of the same name in 335 BC.

References
 Citations

 Sources

 
 

Regulus, Marcus
3rd-century BC Roman consuls
4th-century BC births
3rd-century BC deaths
Year of birth unknown
Year of death unknown